Dorokhov is a Slavic masculine surname, its feminine counterpart is Dorokhova. Notable people with the surname include:

Vladimir Dorokhov (born 1954), Russian volleyball player
Tetyana Dorokhova (born 1985), Ukrainian archer

Russian-language surnames